Gabriel Girard (September 14, 1935 – February 4, 2006) was a politician in Manitoba, Canada.  He served as a Progressive Conservative member of the Manitoba legislature from 1969 to 1973.

He was born in St. Eustache, Manitoba, the son of Paul and Cecile Girard. Girard worked as a teacher, principal, superintendent of schools, real estate agent and grain farmer. He also managed a farm equipment dealership and served on the St. Boniface school board. He married Marcie Yarmie.

Girard first ran for the Manitoba legislature in the 1966 election, in the rural constituency of Emerson in the province's southeast corner.  He lost to Liberal incumbent John Tanchak by 175 votes.  He ran again in the 1969 election and defeated Tanchak by 453 votes, as the Liberals saw their support base decrease in rural Manitoba.

Girard does not appear to have played a major role in the legislature, and did not seek re-election in 1973.

References

Progressive Conservative Party of Manitoba MLAs
Franco-Manitoban people
1935 births
2006 deaths